is a passenger railway station located in the city of Ōzu, Ehime Prefecture, Japan. It is operated by JR Shikoku and has the station number "S16".

Lines
Only local trains stop at the station. Connections with other services are needed to travel further east of Matsuyama on the line.

Layout
The station, which is unstaffed, consists of a side platform serving a single track. There is no station building, only a shelter on the platform for waiting passengers. A ramp up to the platform from the access road.

History
Japanese National Railways (JNR) opened the station on 20 October 1961 as an added stop on the existing Yosan Line. With the privatization of JNR on 1 April 1987, the station came under the control of JR Shikoku.

Surrounding area
Ozu City Miyoshi Contact Office
Ozu City Miyoshi Elementary School

See also
 List of railway stations in Japan

References

External links
Station timetable

Railway stations in Ehime Prefecture
Railway stations in Japan opened in 1961
Ōzu, Ehime